The Gengidae are a family of Fulgoromorpha (planthoppers), with species found in South Africa.

Genera and species
Fulgoromorpha Lists On the Web includes four species in two genera:
 Acrometopum Stål, 1853
 Acrometopum costatipenne Stål, 1855 - type species
 Acrometopum panoblites (Fennah, 1949)
 Acrometopum theroni Emeljanov, 2007
 Microeurybrachys Muir, 1931 - monotypic
 Microeurybrachys vitrifrons Muir, 1931

References

External links

Auchenorrhyncha families
Hemiptera of Africa